Henry Rudolph Winston  (June 15, 1904 – February 4, 1974) was an American professional baseball pitcher. He played parts of two seasons in Major League Baseball (MLB) for the 1933 Philadelphia Athletics and the 1936 Brooklyn Dodgers.

Winston made his MLB debut with the Athletics on September 30, 1933, against the Boston Red Sox at Shibe Park, pitching 6 innings in relief surrendering 5 earned runs. The Athletics released him the following March. He returned to the majors in 1936 with the Dodgers pitching in 14 games. His only win came on August 15 against the Boston Bees at Ebbets Field when he pitched 5 relief innings in the Dodgers' 6–2 victory.

Born in Youngsville, North Carolina, Winston died in Jacksonville, Florida, in February 1974 at the age of 69.

References

External links

Major League Baseball pitchers
Philadelphia Athletics players
Brooklyn Dodgers players
Henderson Gamecocks players
Allentown Brooks players
Baltimore Orioles (IL) players
Elmira Colonels players
Knoxville Smokies players
Nashville Vols players
Macon Peaches players
Goldsboro Goldbugs players
Baseball players from North Carolina
1904 births
1974 deaths
People from Youngsville, North Carolina